Diller Glacier is located in the U.S. state of Oregon.

See also
 List of glaciers in the United States

References

Glaciers of Oregon
Glaciers of Deschutes County, Oregon